The ABU TV Song Festival 2017 was the sixth annual edition of the ABU TV Song Festivals. The event, which is non-competitive, took place in Chengdu, China on 1 November 2017.

Location

On 1 January 2017, it was announced by the Asia-Pacific Broadcasting Union (ABU) that Chengdu, had been chosen to host the sixth edition of the TV Song Festival on 25 October 2017.

Participation list

See also
 ABU TV Song Festival
 ABU Radio Song Festival 2017
 Asia-Pacific Broadcasting Union
 Bala Turkvision Song Contest 2017
 Eurovision Song Contest 2017
 Eurovision Young Dancers 2017
 Junior Eurovision Song Contest 2017
 Turkvision Song Contest 2017

References

External links
 

2017 song contests
November 2017 events in China
ABU Song Festivals
Music festivals in China
Arts in Chengdu